Tangal-e Mazar (also Romanized as Tangal-e Mazār and Tangal Mazār) is a village in Bala Velayat Rural District, Bala Velayat District, Bakharz County, Razavi Khorasan Province, Iran. At the 2006 census, its population was 469, in 85 families.

References 

Populated places in Bakharz County